Ellis Beare (fl. 1382–1397), of Nether Exe, Devon, was an English politician.

He was a Member (MP) of the Parliament of England for Barnstaple in October 1382, November 1384, for Plympton Erle in February 1383, April 1384 and February 1388 and for Totnes in 1385, 1395 and January 1397.

References

Year of birth unknown
Year of death unknown
English MPs October 1382
English MPs February 1383
English MPs April 1384
English MPs November 1384
English MPs 1385
English MPs February 1388
English MPs 1395
English MPs January 1397
Members of the Parliament of England (pre-1707) for Totnes
Members of the Parliament of England for Plympton Erle
Members of the Parliament of England (pre-1707) for Barnstaple